Jeremy Childs is a former American football wide receiver. He was signed by the San Diego Chargers as an undrafted free agent in 2009. He played college football at Boise State.

Early years
Coached by John Barnes, he played high school football at Los Alamitos High School. He helped lead team to a 12-2 record and a runner-up finish in the CIF Division I playoffs. Childs was named first-team all-state, first-team all-county, first-team Long Beach Dream Team, L.A. Times, and All-Sunset League; offensive player of the year; All-CIF; a CBS SportsLine All-American; and to second-team EA Sports All-National team . He caught 85 passes for 1,258 yards and 22 touchdowns. Childs was a member of Honor Roll and named scholar-athlete.

College career
Childs is a two-time first-team All-WAC selection, he elected to follow the lead of his cousin, former Broncos cornerback Orlando Scandrick, in leaving after his junior season for the opportunity of NFL riches. Childs leaves Boise State second all-time in receptions (168), though his 1,999 yards rank only 11th in school history. That also represents scouts' greatest concern about Childs; a lack of speed and elusiveness to make yardage after the catch. Like Scandrick, Childs could surprise in workouts, leading to a late push up the board. Had an arm span of 33 inches and a hand span of 9 inches at the combine. He was suspended for the 2007 Hawaii Bowl and again for the 2008 season opener (against Idaho State)

Professional career
2009 NFL Combine Results:
40 Yard Dash : 4.69 seconds
Vertical Jump : 33.5 inches
Broad Jump : 115.0 inches
3 Cone Drill : 6.9 seconds
20 Yard Shuttle : 4.26 seconds
60 Yard Shuttle : 11.29 seconds

Childs signed a free agent contract with the National Football League San Diego Chargers. On June 23, 2009, he was cut from the Chargers.

References

https://web.archive.org/web/20090910203144/http://www.2news.tv/sports/48947556.html

External links
Boise State Broncos bio

Further reading

Living people
People from Los Alamitos, California
Players of American football from California
American football wide receivers
Boise State Broncos football players
San Diego Chargers players
Sportspeople from Orange County, California
Year of birth missing (living people)